Ryan Scott Oliver (born August 27, 1984) is an American musical theatre composer and lyricist. He is a 2011 Lucille Lortel Award Nominee and the recipient of both the 2009 Jonathan Larson Grant and the 2008 Richard Rodgers Award for Musical Theater. Oliver is an adjunct professor at Pace University in New York, and Artistic Director of the Pasadena Musical Theatre Program in California. He received his B.A. in Music Composition from UCLA and his M.F.A. in Musical Theatre Writing from the Tisch School of the Arts at New York University. He is also the creator of the blog Crazytown and a member of ASCAP. Oliver's work has been performed at the Writers Guild Awards, Off Broadway in TheatreWorksUSA's We the People, and in countless showcases.

Ryan, along with actress Lindsay Mendez, founded and currently runs Actor Therapy: a five-week training experience for young actors in NYC.

He is openly gay and is married to photographer Matthew Murphy.

Early life
Oliver was born in Pasadena, California and his interest in musicals began at 9 years old when he joined a local summer musical theater camp. In 2004, Oliver took over the program as Artistic Director and renamed it the Pasadena Musical Theatre Program. Oliver also attended the Los Angeles County High School for the Arts.

Works

Mrs. Sharp
Mrs. Sharp (previously called Alive at Ten), with music and lyrics by Oliver and book by Kirsten Guenther, is loosely based on the 1991 teacher-student sex scandal and murder trial surrounding Pamela Smart. Mrs. Sharp was given a staged reading at Playwrights Horizons in 2009 in a production directed by Michael Greif with Jane Krakowski as the title character. Playwright Horizons described Mrs. Sharp as:

Darling
Darling, conceived by Brett Ryback and with the book, music and lyrics by Oliver, is a dark retelling of J.M. Barrie's Peter Pan. It follows sixteen year-old Darling in 1920s New England, and her adventures with Peter, a rent-boy. With him, she explores the seedy underground world of drugs, sex, and a white powder called Dust. Darling was featured on the "Bound for Broadway" episode of NBC's The Apprentice in 2010, and was presented by Pace New Musicals Program in 2009, and in 2012, was given a private workshop and developmental production as a collaboration between Retrop Production and RareWorks Theatre Company, in association with Sh-K-Boom Records, at Emerson College. In 2013, Darling received The Weston Playhouse Theatre Company New Musical Award. In 2019, a staged reading of "Darling" was performed at NYU's Steinhardt School of Culture, Education and Human Development.

35MM
35MM, a multimedia "musical exhibition" in which photographic images, by Oliver in collaboration with photographer Matthew Murphy inspire music and lyrics, and inversely music and lyrics inspire photographs, is preserved as an original cast recording by the Ghostlight label. A full developmental production was presented at Urban Stages in December 2010, directed by Daisy Prince. 35MM made its Off-Broadway World Premiere at the Galapagos Art Space in New York City on March 7, 2012. Due to popular demand, the show was extended and sold out its run. 35MM is currently being licensed and has received productions in Baltimore, MD, Dayton, OH, London and Canada in 2013. In June 2015, it made its Australian premiere in the inaugural season of Harvest Rain's Incubator Series in Brisbane, Queensland.

Jasper in Deadland
Jasper in Deadland is a pop-rock musical based on the myth of Orpheus and Eurydice. It follows 16-year-old Jasper Jarvis as he travels through the Afterlife on a mission to save his best friend, Agnes. Jasper in Deadland was commissioned in 2011 for the Pasadena Musical Theatre Program, and premiered as part of the Los Angeles Festival of New Musicals. In 2014 it was produced by Prospect Theater Company at the West End Theatre in New York City starring Matt Doyle, Ben Crawford, Allison Scagliotti, and Bonnie Milligan and directed by BrandoScagliottin Ivie. In 2015, it had a tryout at the 5th Avenue Theatre in Seattle, Washington, with Matt Doyle, Sydney Shepherd, and Louis Hobson and directed by Brandon Ivie. In February 2016 at Studio 54 a CD release concert was held starring Matt Doyle and Sydney Shepard. The CD was released in May 2016.

We Foxes

We Foxes, a Southern Gothic Thriller set in Missouri, 1945, is a new project started commissioned by Broadway Across America. We Foxes tells about Willa, a tough and unmannered orphan girl adopted by the Sheriff’s Wife, a calculating socialite, and the bloody domestic war that ensues between them when the girl uncovers the terrible secrets lurking beneath the floorboards. Oliver attended the TheatreWorks Silicon Valley Writer's Retreat in April 2013 for We Foxes. This show was also featured at CAP 21 and the Weston Playhouse.

Other works
Music+Lyrics by Ryan Scott Oliver: Vol. I: Oliver's first songbook, published by Hal Leonard.
 The Frog Prince Continued, commissioned by Chicago's Emerald City Theatre
 Rated RSO: A collection of Oliver's work which has been performed at the Kennedy Center, New York Musical Theatre Festival, Joe's Pub, Pace University, and Boston Court Performing Arts Center
Circle 9: a One-Act Musical: Music by Brian Valencia, book and lyrics by Oliver
Angus Oblong's The Debbies, A Ten Minute Musical: Music by Oliver and book and lyrics by Gordon Leary, inspired by characters from Angus Oblong's Creepy Susie and 13 Other Tragic Tales for Troubled Children and The Oblongs
Out of my Head, A Musical Revue: Music and lyrics by Oliver, book by Kirsten Guenther
Quit India: Book, music, and lyrics by B.T. Ryback and Oliver, is a musical retelling of the opera Lakmé

Awards
2013 The Weston Playhouse Theatre Company New Musical Award (for Darling)
 2009 Jonathan Larson Grant Recipient
2008 Richard Rodgers Award for Musical Theater Winner (for Mrs. Sharp)
2007 ASCAP Foundation Harold Adamson Lyric Award Recipient
2007 Margo Lion Award for Excellence in Adaptation for Alive at Ten with Kristen Guenther
2007 Dramatist Guild Fellowship

References

External links 
 

Living people
1984 births
American musical theatre composers
Songwriters from California
Tisch School of the Arts alumni
University of California, Los Angeles alumni
Musicians from Pasadena, California
Los Angeles County High School for the Arts alumni